Seal may refer to any of the following:

Common uses
 Pinniped, a diverse group of semi-aquatic marine mammals, many of which are commonly called seals, particularly:
 Earless seal, or "true seal"
 Fur seal
 Eared seal
 Seal (emblem), a device to impress an emblem, used as a means of authentication, on paper, wax, clay or another medium (the impression is also called a seal)  
 Seal (mechanical), a device which helps prevent leakage, contain pressure, or exclude contamination where two systems join

Arts, entertainment and media
 Seal (1991 album), by Seal
 Seal (1994 album), sometimes referred to as Seal II, by Seal
 Seal IV, a 2003 album by Seal
 Seal Online, a 2003 massively multiplayer online role-playing game

Law
 Seal (contract law), a legal formality for contracts and other instruments
 Seal (East Asia), a stamp used in East Asia as a form of a signature
 Record sealing

Military
 Fairey Seal, a 1930s British carrier-borne torpedo bomber aircraft
 HMS Seal, two Royal Navy ships and one submarine
 USS Seal, two American submarines
 Supermarine Seal II, the 1921 British flying boat

Special forces
United States Navy SEALs, the principal special operations force of the U.S. Navy
Thai Navy Seals, Thai Navy special operations force modelled on the U.S. Navy SEALs
Naval Special Operations Command, also known as the Philippine Navy SEALs
ROKN UDT/SEALs, a component of the Republic of Korea Navy Special Warfare Flotilla

People
 Seal (musician) (born 1963), English singer and songwriter
 Seal (surname):
 Aditya Seal (born 1988), Indian actor
 Barry Seal (1939–1986), American drug smuggler and DEA informant
 Brajendra Nath Seal (1864–1938), Indian humanist philosopher and educator
 David Seal (born 1972), Australian soccer player
 Elizabeth Seal (born 1933), Italian actress
 Frances Thurber Seal, American Christian Science practitioner and teacher
 Jaynie Seal (born 1973), Australian television presenter
 Jimmy Seal (born 1950), English footballer
 Kevin Seal, American television presenter and actor
 Manuel Seal (born 1960), American songwriter-producer
 Michael Seal (born 1970), British orchestral conductor and classical violinist
 Mike Seal (fighter) (born 1977), Mexican mixed martial artist
 Mutty Lall Seal (1792–1854), Indian Bengali businessman and philanthropist
 Paul Seal (born 1952), American football tight end 
 Sudhangshu Seal (born 1945), Indian politician

Places
 Seal, Kent, a village and civil parish in England
 Seal, Ohio, an unincorporated community
 Seal Beach, California, a city located in Orange County, USA
 Seal Cay, а island within the Bahamas
 Seal Harbour, Nova Scotia, a community in Guysborough County, Canada
 Seal Lake, a lake in Greenland

Other uses
 "Seal", a generic term for the surface treatment of sealed roads (and by extension, a term used for the roads themselves)
 Seal brown
 Seal of the prophets, a title given to the Islamic prophet, Muhammad
 Seal script, ancient Chinese calligraphy
 Security seal, a device used to show whether a locking device has been opened
 BYD Seal, an electric sedan
 Select Entry Accelerated Learning, a program used in Victoria, Australia, in some secondary schools

See also
 SEAL (disambiguation)
 Seale (disambiguation)
 Sealing (disambiguation)
 Seals (disambiguation)